The 2016 MEAC women's basketball tournament took  place March 7–12, 2016, at the Norfolk Scope in Norfolk, Virginia The champion will receive the conference's automatic bid to the 2016 NCAA tournament.

Seeds 
All 13 tweams contested the tournament.

Teams were seeded by record within the conference, with a tiebreaker system to seed teams with identical conference records.

Schedule

Bracket

* denotes overtime period

References

MEAC women's basketball tournament
Basketball competitions in Norfolk, Virginia
College basketball tournaments in Virginia
Women's sports in Virginia